Adam's horseshoe bat (Rhinolophus adami) is a species of bat in the family Rhinolophidae. It is endemic to Republic of the Congo. It roosts in caves.

Taxonomy and etymology
It was described as a new species in 1968. The holotype used to describe the species was collected by J. P. Adam, who is likely the eponym for the species name "adami." The genus Rhinolophus, of which the Adam's horseshoe bat is a member, is divided into species groups, as it is quite speciose. The Adam's horseshoe bat is the identifier of one of these groups, the adami group. The only other member of the adami group is the Maendeleo horseshoe bat.

Description

Biology and ecology
It is nocturnal, roosting in sheltered places during the day such as caves. It has only been observed in a single cave in the Kouilou Department of the Republic of the Congo. 

It is currently evaluated as data deficient by the IUCN. As of 2019, the species had not been observed since the series of ten individuals used to describe the species in 1968.

References

Rhinolophidae
Fauna of the Republic of the Congo
Endemic fauna of the Republic of the Congo
Mammals described in 1968
Bats of Africa
Taxonomy articles created by Polbot
Western Congolian forest–savanna mosaic